Dəhnə or Dakhna or Dekhna or Dakhne or Degne may refer to:
Böyük Dəhnə, Azerbaijan
Kiçik Dəhnə, Azerbaijan
Dəhnə, Davachi, Azerbaijan
Dəhnə, Quba, Azerbaijan
Gömürdəhnə, Azerbaijan